Shiblovka is a rural locality (a village) in Biryakovskoye Rural Settlement, Sokolsky District, Vologda Oblast, Russia. The population was 10 as of 2002.

Geography 
Shiblovka is located 104 km northeast of Sokol (the district's administrative centre) by road. Biryakovo is the nearest rural locality.

References 

Rural localities in Sokolsky District, Vologda Oblast